The Rivoli Theater is a historic theater on the eastern side of Indianapolis, Indiana, United States.  The theater was built in 1927 and was designed by architect Henry Ziegler Dietz.  Originally designed and built as a single screen movie theater by Universal Pictures, it was sold in 1937 and continued to provide motion pictures and live entertainment until its final closure in 1992.  Since this time the venue has remained largely vacant. In 2007 the Rivoli Theater was acquired by the Rivoli Center for the Performing Arts, Inc., with the intent to restore and reopen the theater.

It was listed on the National Register of Historic Places in 2004.

References

External links 
 Rivoli Theatre
 Prairie Ghosts

Theatres on the National Register of Historic Places in Indiana
Theatres completed in 1927
Mission Revival architecture in Indiana
National Register of Historic Places in Indianapolis